The John Bohlen Lectureship was a series of lectures on a subject relating to the Christian religion, delivered annually in the city of Philadelphia.

History and endowment
John Bohlen, who died in Philadelphia on 26 April 1874, bequeathed to trustees $100,000, to be distributed to religious and charitable objects in accordance with the well-known wishes of the testator.

By a deed of trust, executed 2 June 1875, the trustees transferred and paid over to "The Rector, Church Wardens, and Vestrymen of the Church of the Holy Trinity, Philadelphia," in trust, a sum of money for certain designated purposes, out of which fund the sum of $10,000 was set apart for the endowment of The John Bohlen Lectureship, upon stated terms and conditions.

The conditions provided for the appointment of a qualified person, whether clergyman or layman, to deliver and allow to be published two or more lecture sermons, delivery to be in the city of Philadelphia. The subject was to be matters connected with or referring to the Christian religion.

The lecturer was appointed annually in May, by a committee consisting of:
the Bishop of the Protestant Episcopal Church of the Diocese in which is the Church of the Holy Trinity
the Rector of said Church
the Professor of Biblical Learning in the Divinity School of the Protestant Episcopal Church in Philadelphia
the Professor of Systematic Divinity in said School
the Professor of Ecclesiastical History in said school.

Catalogue of titles (incomplete)
1878: F. D. Huntington, Fitness of Christianity to Man, Thomas Whittaker
1879: Phillips Brooks, The Influence of Jesus, Griffith Farran & Co.
1880: J. S. Howson, The Evidential Value of the Acts of the Apostles, E. P. Dutton
1882: Samuel Smith Harris, The Relation of Christianity to Civil Society, Thomas Whittaker
1883: Alexander Viets Griswold Allen, The Continuity of Christian Thought: A Study of Modern Theology in the Light of its History, Houghton Mifflin Co.
1887: J. F. Garrison, The American Prayer Book: Its Principles and the Law of its Use, Porter & Coates
1891: W. R. Huntington, Peace of the Church, Nisbet
1895(?): Hugh Miller Thompson, The World and the Wrestlers: Personality and Responsibility, Thomas Whittaker
1897: Laurence Henry Schwab, The Kingdom of God: An Essay in Theology, E. P. Dutton & Co.
1899(?): Henry S. Nash, Ethics and Revelation, Macmillan
1905: Harry Peirce Nichols, The Temporary and the Permanent in New Testament Revelation, Thomas Whittaker
1906: James Alan Montgomery, The Samaritans, the Earliest Jewish Sect, The John C. Winston Co.
1909: Arthur Rogers, Prophecy and Poetry: Studies in Isaiah and Browning
1910: C. H. W. Johns, The Religious Significance of Semitic Proper Names, A. P. Dixon
1914: Samuel Hart, Faith and the Faith
1915: Andrew D. Heffern, Apology and Polemic in the New Testament
1919: Percy Dearmer, The Art of Public Worship, A. R. Mowbray & Co.
1924: Philo W. Sprague, Influence of Christianity on Fundamental Human Institutions, Fleming H. Revell Co.
1925: W. Cosby Bell, Sharing in Creation: Studies in the Christian View of the World, Macmillan
1928: Carl E. Grammer, Things that Remain
1931: Henry Bradford Washburn, Men of Conviction
1935: George A. Barton, The Apostolic Age and the New Testament
1936: Fleming James, Thirty Psalmists: A Study in Personalities of the Psalter as seen against the Background of Gunkel's Type-Study of the Psalms, Putnam
1938: Howard Chandler Robbins, Preaching the Gospel, Harper and Brothers
1943: Samuel A. B. Mercer, The Supremacy of Israel, Christopher Publishing House
1945(?): Theodore Otto Wedel, The Coming Great Church: Essays on Church Unity, Macmillan
1945: W. Norman Pittenger, His Body, the Church, Morehouse-Goreham Co.
1959: Massey Hamilton Shepherd, Jr., The Reform of Liturgical Worship: Perspectives and Prospects, Oxford University Press
1962: John Knox, The Church and the Reality of Christ, Harper & Row

References

Series of books
Christian theological lectures